William Cavendish, 5th Duke of Devonshire,  (14 December 1748 – 29 July 1811), was a British nobleman, aristocrat, and politician. He was the eldest son of William Cavendish, 4th Duke of Devonshire, by his wife, the heiress Lady Charlotte Boyle, suo jure Baroness Clifford, who brought in considerable money and estates to the Cavendish family. He was invited to join the Cabinet on three occasions, but declined each offer. He was Lord High Treasurer of Ireland and Governor of Cork, and Lord Lieutenant of Derbyshire. In 1782, he was made a Knight of the Order of the Garter.

The 5th Duke is best known for his first wife Georgiana, Duchess of Devonshire. At the age of about twenty, Devonshire toured Italy with William Fitzherbert which is where they commissioned the pair of portraits by Pompeo Batoni.

Family and inheritance
He was married twice: first, to Lady Georgiana Spencer (1757–1806) daughter of John Spencer, 1st Earl Spencer; second, to Lady Elizabeth Foster, née Hervey (1759–1824), daughter of the 4th Earl of Bristol; Lady Elizabeth had been his mistress and his first wife's friend and confidante for more than twenty years.

First marriage
By his first wife, he had one son (William Cavendish, 6th Duke of Devonshire, sometimes called "The Bachelor Duke", who succeeded him and who died unmarried in 1858), and two daughters: Lady Georgiana "Little G" Cavendish, later the Countess of Carlisle (wife of George Howard, 6th Earl of Carlisle), and Lady Harriet "Harryo" Cavendish, later the Countess Granville (wife of Lord Granville Leveson-Gower, who would be created 1st Earl Granville). 

Both daughters left descendants and the title of Clifford barony fell into abeyance between them. The dukedom and estates would pass to a grandson of a younger brother of the 5th Duke of Devonshire; however, the 7th Duke of Devonshire would marry a daughter of the 6th Earl of Carlisle, who was thus a granddaughter of the 5th Duke and niece of the 6th Duke.

Georgiana Cavendish became a socialite who would gather around her a large circle of literary and political friends. Thomas Gainsborough and Joshua Reynolds painted her; the Gainsborough painting would be disposed of by the 5th Duke and would be recovered much later, after many vicissitudes.

Second marriage
By his second wife, Lady Elizabeth Foster, he had no legitimate issue, but the couple had two illegitimate children born before their marriage. A son, Augustus, was given the surname Clifford and became Sir Augustus Clifford and rose to be an admiral in the Royal Navy and the Gentleman Usher of the Black Rod in the House of Lords; his descendants would die out in the male line in 1895. The Duke's daughter by Lady Elizabeth, Caroline, was given a different surname from her brother, St. Jules. Caroline St. Jules would marry the Hon. George Lamb, a brother of the 2nd Viscount Melbourne (himself married to Lady Caroline Ponsonby, niece of Lady Georgiana Spencer, the 5th Duke's 1st wife). Caroline and George Lamb had no issue.

Mistress 
The 5th Duke had a daughter—Charlotte, given the surname Williams—by his mistress, Charlotte Spencer, the daughter of an indigent clergyman. His first child was born shortly after his marriage to Lady Georgiana Spencer (no relation to his mistress). Charlotte would later marry suitably.

Buxton 

The fifth Duke would be closely involved with the nearby spa town of Buxton. He would use the profits from his copper mines to transform the town into a replica of Bath, including the Crescent Hotel and an octagonal set of stables, which would later become the Devonshire Dome.

Ancestors

Cavendish in popular culture 
 In the film The Duchess, about Georgiana, the fifth Duke is played by Ralph Fiennes.

References

External links

|-

1748 births
1811 deaths
William Cavendish, 5th Duke of Devonshire
105
07
Children of prime ministers of the United Kingdom
Knights of the Garter
Lord-Lieutenants of Derbyshire
Lord High Treasurers of Ireland